The Eastern Division of Fiji is one of Fiji's four divisions.  It consists of Kadavu Province, Lau Province, Lomaiviti Province and Rotuma.

The capital of the division is Levuka, on the Ovalau island.   Other islands in the division include Kadavu, Gau, Koro, Nairai, Moala, Matuku, Vatu Vara, Naitaba, Mago, Cicia, Tuvuca, Lakeba, Vanua Vatu, Oneata, Vuaqava, Kabara, Moce, and Fulaga.

The division is the largest by area (including the sea), but has the smallest land area.  The division has sea borders with Central, Northern and Western Divisions.

External links 
 Divisions of Fiji / Statoids

Eastern